Franklin Manor 22 is a Mi'kmaq reserve located in Cumberland County, Nova Scotia. It is administratively split between the Pictou Landing First Nation and the Paq'tnkek First Nation.

The community is named after Nova Scotia Governor  Michael Francklin, who spoke Mi'kmaq and whose funeral was attended by hundreds of Mi'kmaq. Franklin Manor, Champs-Élysées, Maccan, and Nappan are villages where the Acadians lived post deportation, in Cumberland County, Nova Scotia, not far from the Beaubassin / Ft. Beausejour area.

References

Indian reserves in Nova Scotia
Communities in Cumberland County, Nova Scotia
Mi'kmaq in Canada